Nyankpa or Yeskwa (nyankpá) is a Plateau language of Nigeria. It sometimes appears in the literature as Nyenkpa, which is a dialect.

Dialects
The main dialects are Panda, Tattara, Bede and Gitata (Buzi). The prestige dialect is Tattara, which is said to be the standard form of the language.

References

External links
Roger Blench: Nyankpa (Yeskwa) language page

Central Plateau languages
Languages of Nigeria